The 15th Operations Group (15 OG) is the flying component of the 15th Wing, assigned to the United States Air Force Thirteenth Air Force. The group is stationed at Hickam Air Force Base, Hawaii. It is also responsible for managing operational matters at Bellows Air Force Station, Hawaii and Wake Island Airfield.

The 15th Operations Group has three operational squadrons assigned flying C-17, KC-135, F-22, C-40B, and C-37A aircraft along with an operational support squadron supporting the Commander, U.S. Pacific Command and the Commander, Pacific Air Forces.

History

On 1 April 1992 the 15th Operations Group was activated when the USAF objective wing organization was implemented for the 15th Air Base Wing implementing the USAF objective wing organization. Upon activation, the 15th OG assumed responsibility from the 15th Air Base Wing for managing operational matters at Hickam AFB and Bellows AFS, Hawaii; and Wake Island Airfield.  The group also provided command and control for the defense of the Hawaiian Islands and directed tactical control of Hawaii Air National Guard alert F-15 aircraft. It was assigned the flying squadrons previously assigned to the wing.

Its 25th Air Support Operations Squadron provided combat ready tactical air control parties ready to advise on the employment of air assets in training and combat and to deploy worldwide with each brigade and battalion of the U.S. Army's 25th Infantry Division and other designated ground components. Beginning in 1992, the group had one airlift squadron assigned and equipped with specially configured C-135 aircraft, which provided transportation for the Commander, US Pacific Command, Commander, Pacific Air Forces, and other high-ranking civilian, military, and foreign dignitaries.

Added C-37 aircraft in 2002 and C-40 aircraft in 2003; retired C-135 aircraft in 2003. Assigned second airlift squadron in 2005.

The 15th Operations Group is integrated with the 154th Operations Group of the Hawaii Air National Guard in the "total force" concept.  Three of its four flying squadrons have associate units of the Guard integrated with them:
 The 19th Fighter Squadron and the 199th Fighter Squadron
 The 535th Airlift Squadron and the 204th Airlift Squadron
 The 96th Air Refueling Squadron and the 203d Air Refueling Squadron

In 2010, the group added more aircraft to its inventory, when the 19th Fighter Squadron and 96th Air Refueling Squadron were activated. However, the air refueling squadron was inactivated in September 2015.

Components in 2018
The 15th Operations Group (Tail Code: HH) consists of the following squadrons:

 15th Operations Support Squadron
 19th Fighter Squadron (Lockheed-Martin F-22 Raptor)
 65th Airlift Squadron (Gulfstream C-37 and Boeing C-40 Clipper) "Special Missions Hawaii"
 535th Airlift Squadron (McDonnell Douglas C-17 Globemaster III)

Lineage
 Constituted as 15 Operations Group on 1 April 1992
 Activated on 13 April 1992

Assignments
 15th Air Base Wing (later 15th Wing), 13 April 1992 – present

Components
 15th Air Intelligence Squadron: 13 April 1992 – 1 June 1994
 15th Operations Support Squadron: 13 April 1992 – present
 19th Fighter Squadron: 4 October 2010 – present
 25th Air Liaison Squadron (later 25th Air Support Operations Squadron): 13 April 1992 – 19 October 2008
 65th Airlift Squadron: 13 April 1992 – present
 96th Air Refueling Squadron: 23 July 2010 – 3 September 2015
 535th Airlift Squadron: 18 April 2005 – present

Stations
 Hickam Air Force Base, Hawaii, 13 April 1992 – present

Aircraft assigned
 Boeing C-135 Stratofreighter, 1992–2003
 Boeing C-37 Clipper, 2002–present
 C-40, 2003–present
 McDonnell Douglas C-17 Globemaster III, 2005–present
 Boeing KC-135 Stratotanker, 1992–2003; 2013–2015
 Lockheed-Martin F-22 Raptor, 2010–present

References

External links
 Factsheet, 15th Reconnaissance Squadron (accessed 2 April 2012)
 Factsheet, 19th Fighter Squadron (accessed 2 April 2012)
 Factsheet, 65th Airlift Squadron (accessed 2 April 2012)
 Factsheet, 535th Airlift Squadron (accessed 2 April 2012)

015
Military units and formations in Hawaii
Military units and formations established in 1992